General elections to the Cortes Generales were held in Spain on August 24, 1872. At stake were all 391 seats in the Congress of Deputies. The Radical-Democratic Party won the elections.

History
General elections of Spain of 1872 were held on August 24 under universal male suffrage. The elections were held during the brief reign of Amadeo I.

Results

References

 CONGRESO DE LOS DIPUTADOS - HISTORICO DE DIPUTADOS 1810-1977
  Elecciones Cortes Constituyentes - 24 de agosto de 1872

1872 elections in Spain
General elections in Spain
August 1872 events